The Happy Poet is a 2010 film written and directed by Paul Gordon. It was shot on-location in Austin, Texas, US. It has appeared at a number of film festivals, including the Venice Film Festival's  Giornate Degli Autori ("Authors' Days") section.

Cast
Paul Gordon
Jonny Mars
Chris Doubek
Liz Fisher
Amy Myers Martin
Ricardo Lerma
Sam Wainwright Douglas
Carlos Trevino

Film festivals
Venice Film Festival 2010
SXSW Film Festival 2010
Traverse City Film Festival where it won the Fiction Jury Prize for Emerging Talent
Oldenburg International Film Festival 2010, won the German Independence Award (Audience Award).

References

External links
 

2010 films
Films shot in Austin, Texas
2010 comedy-drama films
American comedy-drama films
2010s English-language films
2010s American films